Ekaterina Buzmakova is a Russian Paralympic judoka. She represented Russia at the 2004 Summer Paralympics and at the 2008 Summer Paralympics and she won the bronze medal in the women's 57 kg event in 2004.

References

External links 
 

Living people
Year of birth missing (living people)
Place of birth missing (living people)
Russian female judoka
Judoka at the 2004 Summer Paralympics
Judoka at the 2008 Summer Paralympics
Medalists at the 2004 Summer Paralympics
Paralympic bronze medalists for Russia
Paralympic medalists in judo
Paralympic judoka of Russia
21st-century Russian women